Sun Wu may refer to:

 Sun Wu, the birth name of Sun Tzu, a Chinese military strategist of the sixth century BC and the author of The Art of War
 Sun Wu, an alternative name for Eastern Wu, a state in southeastern China during the Three Kingdoms period